Shloyme Zanvl Rappoport (1863 – November 8, 1920), known by his pseudonym S. Ansky (or An-sky), was a Jewish author, playwright, researcher of Jewish folklore, polemicist, and cultural and political activist. He is best known for his play The Dybbuk or Between Two Worlds, written in 1914.

In 1917, after the Russian Revolution, he was elected to the Russian Constituent Assembly as a Social-Revolutionary deputy.

Biography

S. Ansky was born in Chashniki, Vitebsk Governorate, Russian Empire (now Belarus), and died in Otwock, Poland on November 8, 1920.

Ethnographic work

Under the influence of the Russian narodnik movement, Ansky became interested in ethnography, as well as socialism, and became a political activist.  Between 1911 and the outbreak of World War I in 1914, he headed ethnographic expeditions to various Jewish towns of Volhynia and Podolia, composing a detailed ethnographic questionnaire of more than 2000 questions.

Ansky's ethnographic collections were locked away in Soviet vaults for years, but some material has come to light since the 1990s.  The State Ethnographic Museum at St. Petersburg holds a good deal of it. Some of his vast collection of cylinder recordings made on these expeditions have been transferred to CD as well.

His ethnographic report of the deliberate destruction of Jewish communities by the Russian army in the First World War, The Enemy at His Pleasure: A Journey Through the Jewish Pale of Settlement During World War I,  has become a major source in the historiography of the war's impact on civilian populations.

Literary career

Initially he wrote in Russian, but from 1904 he became known mainly as a Yiddish author.

He is best known for his play The Dybbuk or Between Two Worlds, written in 1914. The play was first staged in the Elyseum Theatre in Warsaw, on December 9, 1920, one month (at the end of the 30-day mourning period) after the author's death. It was subsequently translated into a dozen or more languages and performed thousands of times all over the world. It is still being produced, along with numerous adaptations, as well as operas, ballets, and symphonic suites. (For example, in 2011 there were seven different productions.) It is considered the jewel of the Jewish theatre. In the early years The Dybbuk was considered so significant that parodies of it were written and produced.

Although The Dybbuk is Ansky’s best-known work, he published many works of literature, politics and ethnography. His Collected Works, which do not include all his writings, comprise fifteen volumes. Ansky wrote a number of other plays, four of which are included in this collection, long out of print. One (Day and Night) is,  like The Dybbuk, a Hasidic Gothic story. The other three plays have revolutionary themes, and were originally written in Russian: Father and Son, In a Conspiratorial Apartment, and The Grandfather. All four  have recently been republished in a bilingual Yiddish-English edition.

Ansky was also the author of the song Di Shvue (The Oath), which became the anthem of the Jewish Socialist Bund party. He was the author of the poem (later made into a song) "In Zaltsikn Yam" (In the Salty Sea), which was also dedicated to the Bund.

See also
 Yiddish theatre

References

10. Gabriella Safran, Wandering Soul:  The Dybbuk's Creator, S. An-sky (Harvard University Press, 2010)

Further reading
Shmuel Werses.S. An-ski's "Between Two Worlds' (The Dybbuk): A Textual History." in Studies in Yiddish Literature and Folklore. Jerusalem: Hebrew University of Jerusalem, 1986
 Gabriella Safran and Steven Zipperstein (ed.): The worlds of S. An-sky. A Russian intellectual at the turn of the century. Stanford University Press, Stanford, Cal. 2006, 
 Mlotek, Eleanor G.  S. Ansky : (Shloyme-Zanvl Rappoport) 1863-1920 : His Life and Works : Catalog of an Exhibition. [New York]: YIVO Institute for Jewish Research, 1980. OCLC 10304171
 Vladislav Ivanov. S. An-sky, Evgeny Vakhtangov and The Dybbuk // The worlds of S. An-sky. A Russian Jewish Intellectual at the Turn of the Century / Ed. by Gabriella Safran and Steven J. Zipperstein. California, Stanford. Stanford University Press, 2006. P. 252–265, 480–481.
 S. An-sky. Between Two Worlds (The Dybbuk):  Censored Variant. Introduction by Vladislav Ivanov // The worlds of S. An-sky. A Russian Jewish Intellectual at the Turn of the Century / Ed. by Gabriella Safran and Steven J. Zipperstein. California, Stanford. Stanford University Press, 2006. P. 374–436.

External links
Jewish Heritage Online article on Ansky, archived from the original on 2016-01-01
YIVO Encyclopedia of Jews in Eastern Europe

1863 births
1920 deaths
People from Chashniki
People from Lepelsky Uyezd
Jews from the Russian Empire
Belarusian Jews
Narodniks
Bundists
Socialist Revolutionary Party politicians
Russian Constituent Assembly members
Yiddish theatre
Yiddish-language playwrights
Jewish folklorists
20th-century pseudonymous writers